The 2013 Copa del Rey Final was the 111th final since the tournament's establishment (including two seasons where two rival editions were played). The match was a Madrid derby between Real Madrid and Atlético Madrid on 17 May 2013 at the Santiago Bernabéu Stadium in Madrid. It was the clubs' first meeting in the final since 1992 when Atlético won 2–0 over Real Madrid. Before this match, the two teams had met in the final on three other occasions: 1960, 1961 and 1975; all were Atlético wins, except 1975 when Real Madrid won.

Atlético lifted the trophy for the tenth time in their history. It was the first time since 1992 that Atlético had won trophies in two consecutive seasons, following their win in the 2012 UEFA Europa League Final the previous year.

Venue and date
Real Madrid, Atlético Madrid and the Royal Spanish Football Federation (RFEF) all agreed on Madrid as the location for the event. Due to its greater capacity of 80,000, the Santiago Bernabéu Stadium (Real Madrid's home ground) was chosen as the venue over Atlético's Vicente Calderón stadium. Each team was allocated 30,000 tickets to sell, and the remainder were allocated to the RFEF.

The match was originally scheduled for Saturday, 18 May, but was moved to Friday, 17 May for TV broadcast reasons.

Match ball
Adidas provided the official ball for the match, the Adidas Cafusa, the same ball used for the 2013 FIFA Confederations Cup.

Road to the final

Match

See also
2012–13 Copa del Rey
Madrid derby

References

2013
1
Real Madrid CF matches
Atlético Madrid matches
2013 in Madrid
Madrid Derby matches